Nora Lafi is a French historian of Algerian origin, born in 1965 in Istres, near Marseilles. She is currently a researcher with the Zentrum Moderner Orient (ZMO) in Berlin. She is a specialist of the history of the Ottoman Empire and specifically of Arab towns of North Africa and the Middle-East during the Ottoman period. She chairs, with Ulrike Freitag, the research field "Cities compared: cosmopolitanism in the Mediterranean and beyond", part of the EUME programme at Wissenschaftskolleg Berlin. She is co-founder and editor of H-Mediterranean (H-Net, Michigan State University).
Nora Lafi is an expert in the following fields:
History of the Ottoman Empire
History of Libya, Tunisia and Algeria
The notion of old regime
Comparative history
Urban Studies Middle-East.

Main publications 

Monographies

Esprit civique et organisation citadine dans l'empire ottoman, Leiden, Brill, 2018, 360p.

Une ville du Maghreb entre ancien régime et réformes ottomanes. Tripoli 1795-1911, Paris, 2002

Edited and Co-Edited Books

Understanding the City through its Margins, Abingdon, Routledge, 2017, 190p. (Ed. with U. Freitag and A. Chappatte) 

Urban Violence in the Middle East, Oxford, Berghahn, 2015, 334p. (Ed. with U. Freitag, N. Fuccaro, C. Ghrawi)

Urban Governance Under the Ottomans, Abingdon, Routledge, 2014, 238p. (Ed. with U. Freitag)

The City in the Ottoman Empire, Abingdon, Routledge, 2010, 288p. (Ed. with U. Freitag, M. Fuhrmann, F. Riedler)

Municipalités Méditerranéennes, Berlin, K. Schwarz, 2005, 370p.

External links 
 Nora Lafi´s homepage at H-Net

1965 births
Living people
French women historians
French people of Algerian descent
People from Istres
20th-century French historians
21st-century French historians